Annelie Sjöholm (born 7 September 1995) is a Swedish professional golfer who plays on the Ladies European Tour.

Career
Sjöholm started to play golf when she was eight years old. She played handball and football for six years but stopped when she was 13 to focus on golf. She won nine junior tournaments between 2009 and 2015, and attributes her success to her aspiration to beat her twin brother Tobias, with whom she toured Sweden competing on the junior circuit.

Sjöholm played college golf at Campbell University in Buies Creek, North Carolina, between 2014 and 2018. She was runner-up in her college debut at the LPGA Xavier Invitational behind Tiffany Chan. In 2016, she helped lead the Campbell Lady Camels golf team to the conference title and was runner-up in the Big South Championship. Her first collegiate win came at the 2017 Amelia Island Collegiate, where she shot a 61 in the second round. Leading the conference in stroke average, she was named Big South Conference Golfer of the Year in 2017 and again in 2018.

Directly following her college graduation, Sjöholm turned professional in June 2018 and started playing on the LET Access Series and the Swedish Golf Tour, where she won her maiden professional title at the Slite Open in August. 2019 was her rookie year on the Ladies European Tour, but with limited status she played in only three LET tournaments with a best finish of T25 in the South African Women's Open. On the LET Access Series, she lost a playoff at the Neuchatel Ladies Championship in Switzerland in May, but triumphed in the Anna Nordqvist Västerås Open at her home course in August, beating Maja Stark by one stroke.

Amateur wins
2009 Skandia Tour Regional #3 - Västmanland, Skandia Tour Regional #5 - Västmanland
2010 Skandia Tour Regional #3 - Småland, Skandia Tour Regional #5 - Västmanland
2011 Vassunda Junior Open, Skandia Tour Regional #4 - Östergötland
2012 Gullbringa Junior Open
2013 Skandia Tour Riks #5 Västmanland, Junior Masters Invitational
2015 Skandia Tour Riks #2 Småland, McDonald's Juniorpokal
2017 Amelia Island Collegiate

Sources:

Professional wins (2)

LET Access Series (1)

^Co-sanctioned with the Swedish Golf Tour

Swedish Golf Tour (2)
2018 Slite Open
2019 Anna Nordqvist Västerås Open^
^Co-sanctioned with the LET Access Series

References

External links

Swedish female golfers
Campbell Lady Camels golfers
Ladies European Tour golfers
Sportspeople from Västerås
1995 births
Living people